The Dancing Cheat is a 1924 American silent drama film directed by Irving Cummings and starring Herbert Rawlinson, Alice Lake, and Robert Walker.

Plot
As described in a film magazine review, Brownlow Clay, member of an old Southern family, runs a square gambling house in Tijuana. In a cafe he meets Poppy, a dancer and the wife of a crooked gambler named Kane, who is willing to go the limit in order to achieve her aim. When Clay refuses to respond to her advances, Poppy, enraged, enters into a scheme with her husband to blackmail him. Kane finds her in Clay's apartments and demands hush money. Poppy, ashamed of the part she is playing in this badger game and genuinely in love with Clay, relents, suffers remorse, and double-crosses her husband instead  of Clay. With Kane out of the way, Clay and Poppy face a happy future together.

Cast

References

Bibliography
 Connelly, Robert B. The Silents: Silent Feature Films, 1910-36, Volume 40, Issue 2. December Press, 1998.
 Munden, Kenneth White. The American Film Institute Catalog of Motion Pictures Produced in the United States, Part 1. University of California Press, 1997.

External links

 

1924 films
1924 drama films
American silent feature films
Silent American drama films
Films directed by Irving Cummings
American black-and-white films
Universal Pictures films
1920s American films
1920s English-language films